Mark Phillips is a British equestrian, the former husband of Anne, Princess Royal.

Mark Phillips or Philips may also refer to:
 Mark Phillips (author), joint pseudonym used by American science fiction writers Lawrence Mark Janifer and Randall Philip Garrett
 Mark Phillips (footballer) (born 1982), English footballer
 Mark Phillips (journalist) (born 1948), Canadian television journalist with CBS News
 Mark Phillips (Guyanese politician) (born 1961), former chief of staff of the Guyana Defence Force, current prime minister of Guyana
 Mark Philips (politician) (1800–1873), British politician, MP
 Mark M. Phillips (born 1951), American astronomer

See also
 Marc Phillips (born 1953), Welsh politician